Reidar Nyborg (April 4, 1923 – April 30, 1990) was a Norwegian cross-country skier who competed during the 1940s. He won a bronze in the 4 × 10 km relay at the 1948 Winter Olympics in St. Moritz.

Cross-country skiing results

Olympic Games

External links
Sports Illustrated medal profile for Nyborg
DatabaseOlympics.com profile
Reidar Nyborg's profile at Sports Reference.com

1923 births
1990 deaths
Norwegian male cross-country skiers
Olympic cross-country skiers of Norway
Olympic bronze medalists for Norway
Cross-country skiers at the 1948 Winter Olympics
Olympic medalists in cross-country skiing
Medalists at the 1948 Winter Olympics